Reminiscing is the first collaborative long-play recording by American country music artists Chet Atkins and Hank Snow, released in 1964.

History
The liner notes, titled "Guitar Duets by a Pair of Favorites", are by Chris Lane, a program director from KAYO radio in Seattle, Washington, who takes credit for recommending the collaboration to RCA.

Snow and Atkins had been doing guitar duets on various radio stations, gathering listeners and fans. Their first single was "Reminiscing", produced roughly seven years before the release of this LP. Atkins and Snow had a hit single in 1955, a guitar duet called "Silver Bell."  A regular at the Grand Ole Opry, Snow was a Hall of Fame country music singer and songwriter. He had a career covering six decades during which he sold more than 80 million albums. Atkins had not only made his mark as a sideman and recording artist on his own, but was also busy producing many major country artists and developing Nashville as a major center for country music recording.

Atkins and Snow joined forces again in 1969 to record C.B. Atkins & C.E. Snow by Special Request. Both albums are out of print and have not been reissued on CD.

Track listing

Side one
 "Indian Love Call" (Rudolf Friml, Oscar Hammerstein, Otto Harbach) – 3:20
 "I Can't Stop Loving You" (Don Gibson) – 2:26
 "Beautiful Dreamer" (Traditional) – 2:54
 "Vaya con Dios" (Larry Russell, Inez James, Buddy Pepper) – 2:54
 "Sonny Boy" (Al Jolson, Buddy DeSylva, Lew Brown, Ray Henderson) – 3:01
 "The Convict and the Rose" (Robert King, Ballard MacDonald) – 2:20

Side two
 "Brahm’s Lullaby" (Johannes Brahms)– 2:14
 "My Isle of Golden Dreams" (Walter Blaufuss, Gus Kahn) – 2:25
 "Blue Tango" (Leroy Anderson) – 2:16
 "Unchained Melody" (Alex North, Hy Zaret) – 2:55
 "In an Old Dutch Garden (By an Old Dutch Mill)" (Mack Gordon, Will Grosz) – 2:12
 "Dark Moon" (Ned Miller]) – 2:35

Personnel
Chet Atkins – guitar, vocals
Hank Snow – guitar, vocals
Marvin Huges – piano
Chubby Wise – fiddle
Ray Edenton – guitar
Jim Carney – drums
Bill McElhiney – trumpet
Bob Moore – bass

Production notes
Engineered by Chuck Seitz
Arrangements by Anita Kerr
Cover photo by Sid O'Berry

See also
The Nashville A-Team

References

1964 albums
Chet Atkins albums
Albums produced by Chet Atkins
Albums produced by Bob Ferguson (music)
RCA Records albums
Hank Snow albums